Megabunus is a genus of harvestmen with six known recent species. All occur in Europe, mostly in the vicinity of the Alps.

In Megabunus, the pedipalps are armed with strong ventral spines, especially on the femur, probably to hold fast to prey.

Name
The genus name is derived from Ancient Greek mega "big" and -bunus, which is a common ending for certain opilionid genera.

Species
 Megabunus armatus (Kulczynski, 1887) (Tirols, Slovenia)
 Megabunus bergomas Chemini, 1985 (Italy)
 Megabunus diadema (Fabricius, 1779) (Western Europe)
 Megabunus lesserti Schenkel, 1927 (Germany, Austria, Switzerland; possibly a variation of M. armatus)
 Megabunus rhinoceros (Canestrini, 1872) (Swiss Alps)
 Megabunus vignai Martens, 1978 (Italy)

Footnotes

References
 's Biology Catalog: Phalangiidae
  (eds.) (2007): Harvestmen - The Biology of Opiliones. Harvard University Press

Further reading
  (1978): Spinnentiere, Arachnida, Weberknechte, Opiliones, ser. Die Tierwelt Deutschlands (Dahl,Friedrich ed.), vol. 64. VEB Gustav Fischer Verlag, Jena

External links
 BioImages: Pictures of M. diadema

Harvestman genera